Lucas Paz Kaufmann (born 26 March 1991) is a Brazilian professional footballer who for Finnish Veikkausliiga club Honka.

Club career

Club
In November 2015, Kaufmann signed for newly promoted Veikkausliiga side PK-35 Vantaa.
After being on trial with HJK, Kaufmann signed a three-year contract with FC Honka on 28 February 2017. In February 2018 Kaufmann suffered a LCL rupture and had to undergo surgery, but he recovered quickly in 4 months just on time for the second home game of the Veikkausliiga-season. Kaufmann was selected to the Veikkausliiga 'Team of the Month' in June 2018, after scoring 4 goals in just 5 games, and again to the 'Team of the Month' in August, this time giving 5 assists in 6 games and playing an important role in Honka's offense.  The 2018 season ended for Honka, however, in a disappointing way, when KuPS took the third place by having a better goal difference.

In 2019 Kaufmann did not start off hot; scoring his first goal of the season not until in a 3–0 home win against HIFK in mid-July.

Career statistics

Club

References

External links

1991 births
Living people
Brazilian footballers
Brazilian expatriate footballers
Sport Club Internacional players
Cerâmica Atlético Clube players
Esporte Clube São José players
C.D. Mafra players
Pallokerho Keski-Uusimaa players
PK-35 Vantaa (men) players
Al-Shabab SC (Seeb) players
Ekenäs IF players
Helsingin Jalkapalloklubi players
FC Honka players
Veikkausliiga players
Kakkonen players
Ykkönen players
Association football forwards
Brazilian expatriate sportspeople in Portugal
Brazilian expatriate sportspeople in Finland
Brazilian expatriate sportspeople in Oman
Expatriate footballers in Portugal
Expatriate footballers in Finland
Expatriate footballers in Oman
Footballers from Porto Alegre